Aziz Kian (also Romanized as ‘Azīz Kīān, ‘Aziz Keyān, and Azīz Kīyan) is a village in Lakan Rural District, in the Central District of Rasht County, Gilan Province, Iran. At the 2006 census, its population was 132, in 44 families.

References 

Populated places in Rasht County